Morten Rasmussen may refer to:
 Morten Rasmussen (footballer, born January 1985), "Duncan", Danish striker who currently plays for Midtjylland (formerly of Celtic)
 Morten Rasmussen (footballer, born March 1985), "Molle", Danish defender who currently plays for AC Horsens

See also
 Morten Rasmussen House, historical house in Utah